Inside Out is a studio album by Philip Bailey, released in 1986 by Columbia Records. The album reached No. 30 on the US Billboard Top Black Albums chart, No. 29 on the Swiss Pop Albums chart and No. 30 on the Swedish Pop Albums chart.

Overview
Inside was produced by Nile Rodgers. Artists such as Jeff Beck, Tawatha Agee, Ray Parker Jr., Nathan East, George Duke and Phil Collins also appeared on the album.

Singles
A song from the album called "State of the Heart", was released as a single, reaching No. 20 on the Billboard Hot Black Singles chart.

Critical reception

Carlo Wolff of the Boston Globe wrote "Bailey's most coherent and relaxed solo album chronicles his walk through city streets, his eyes turned toward the heavens". Don McLeese of the Chicago Sun Times called Inside Out a "polished, consummately crafted collection." Phyl Garland of Stereo Review exclaimed Inside Out "has all the hall-marks of his style-vocal flexibility, a precise manner of punching out the words, and, of course, those spectacular high falsetto notes. What's different from his previous solo efforts is the music itself, which is brassier and closer to rock." Garland added "The knowing hand of producer Nile Rodgers, who seems to perceive exactly what will work for any particular artist, is much in evidence in settings that always complement rather than detract from Bailey's assertive solos." Adam Sweeting of The Guardian called the album "an often incisive set of soul songs". With a four out of five stars rating Thom Duffy of the Orlando Sentinel said "on this new album, Bailey aims for a polished yet punchy funk and ballad style." David Toop of The Times noted "'Inside Out' is produced by Nile Rodgers and is typical of his urban contemporary style. Unspectacular, but Bailey's falsetto is still wonderful."
Fred Bayles of the Associated Press scribed "Inside Out, is a pop album that will grow on you even if you're not a fan of the genre. Just concentrate on that voice."

Track listing

Personnel

Musicians 
 Philip Bailey – lead vocals, backing vocals (1, 3-10), vocoder (1)
 Kevin Jones – Synclavier programming and sequencing
 Nile Rodgers – keyboards (1-4, 6, 9), guitar (1-6, 8, 9, 10), vocoder (1), horns (1), backing vocals (1, 6, 8), bass (2, 3, 4, 6, 9), string arrangements and conductor (2, 7, 8)
 George Duke – acoustic piano (7), keyboards (8)
 Peter Scherer – keyboards (10)
 Ray Parker Jr. – guitar (7, 8)
 Rick Robbins – guitar (7)
 Jeff Beck – guitar (8)
 Darryl Jones – bass (1, 10)
 Nathan East – bass (7, 8)
 Omar Hakim – drums (1, 10), percussion (1) 
 Jimmy Bralower – drums, percussion and sequencing (2-6, 9)
 Phil Collins – drums (7, 8), percussion (7)
 Steve Elson – saxophone (3)
 Gene Orloff – concertmaster (2, 7, 8)
 Tawatha Agee – backing vocals (1)
 Curtis King, Jr. – backing vocals (1, 3, 5, 8, 9)
 Brenda White-King – backing vocals (1, 7)
 Michelle Cobbs – backing vocals (2, 8)
 Diane Garisto – backing vocals (2, 8)
 Lorelei McBroom – backing vocals (6, 7)
 Fonzi Thornton – backing vocals (8)

Production 
 Producers – Nile Rodgers (Tracks 1-6, 9 & 10); Philip Bailey (Tracks 7 & 8).
 Executive Producer – Larkin Arnold
 Engineers – James Farber (Tracks 1-6, 9 & 10); George Massenburg (Tracks 7 & 8).
 Second Engineers – Scott Ansell and Knut Bohn (Tracks 1-6, 9 & 10); Steve Chase (Tracks 7 & 8).
 Additional Engineering (Tracks 1-6, 9 & 10) – Jon Goldberger 
 Recorded at The Power Station (New York, NY), Skyline Studios (New York, NY) and Townhouse Studios (London, UK).
 Mixed by James Farber at Skyline Studios.
 Mastered by Bob Ludwig at Masterdisk (New York, NY).
 Production Manager – Kevin Jones and Budd Tunick
 Art Direction and Design – Lane/Donald
 Photography – Dennis Keeley

Charts

References

1986 albums
Philip Bailey albums
Albums produced by Philip Bailey
Albums produced by Nile Rodgers
Columbia Records albums